Cable Video Store (CVS), was a pay-per-view (PPV) service that was launched in 1985 by General Instrument. It was later owned by Graff Pay-Per-View. Cable Video Store consisted of one channel which carried first run movies and specials (however, it did not carry major sporting events, such as boxing) on a PPV basis. They also offered low cost programs to buy along with the standard PPV fare.

CVS went off the air in May 1997 as the result of other pay-per-view services such as Viewer's Choice (now known as In Demand) and Request TV that provided multi-channels of PPV and the launching of Video on Demand on many cable systems.

See also
Request TV
In Demand (formerly known in the US as Viewer's Choice)
List of United States pay television channels

References

Defunct television networks in the United States
Television channels and stations established in 1985
Television channels and stations disestablished in 1997
1985 establishments in the United States